Rhytidosteidae is a family of Temnospondyli that lived in the Permian and Triassic.

Phylogeny
Below is a cladogram from Dias-da-Silva and Marsicano (2011):

References

Yates, AM (2000), A new tiny rhytidosteid (Temnospondyli: Stereospondyi) from the Early Triassic of Australia and the possibility of hidden temnospondyl diversity.  J. Vert Paleontol. 20:484-489.

External links
Rhytidosteidae at Palaeos.

Stereospondyls
Permian temnospondyls
Triassic temnospondyls
Amphibian families
Lopingian first appearances
Early Triassic extinctions